Keith Scott Crowder (born January 6, 1959) is a Canadian former professional ice hockey right winger who played ten seasons in the National Hockey League from 1980–81 until 1989–90.

Playing career
Crowder was drafted 57th overall by the Boston Bruins in the 1979 NHL Entry Draft. He played 662 career NHL games, scoring 223 goals and 271 assists for 494 points while adding 1354 penalty minutes. His best offensive season was the 1985–86 season, when he set career highs with 38 goals, 46 assists, 84 points, 177 penalty minutes, and 20 power-play goals.

Personal life
Keith has a large family including his younger brother Craig, who played at Sault College from 1986–88 and an older brother Bruce Crowder who also played in the NHL.

Career statistics

References

External links
 

1959 births
Binghamton Dusters players
Birmingham Bulls players
Boston Bruins draft picks
Boston Bruins players
Canadian ice hockey right wingers
Grand Rapids Owls players
Ice hockey people from Ontario
Living people
Los Angeles Kings players
Peterborough Petes (ice hockey) players
Sportspeople from Windsor, Ontario
Springfield Indians players